Lady Chatterley is a 1993 BBC television serial starring Sean Bean and Joely Richardson. It is an adaptation of D. H. Lawrence's 1928 novel Lady Chatterley's Lover, first broadcast on BBC1 in four 55-minute episodes between 6 and 27 June 1993. A young woman's husband returns wounded after the First World War. Facing a life with a husband now incapable of sexual activity she begins an affair with the groundskeeper. The film reflects Lawrence's focus not only on casting away sexual taboos, but also the examination of the British class system.

Cast
 Joely Richardson - Lady Chatterley
 Sean Bean - Mellors
 James Wilby - Sir Clifford Chatterley
 Shirley Anne Field - Mrs Bolton
 Hetty Baynes - Hilda
 Ken Russell - Sir Michael Reid, Lady Chatterley's father

Reception
The show had an audience of over 12 million, for the BBC.

Donald Liebenson, a Chicago-based film critic said "Those who believe British miniseries to be too proper and corseted may want to make an exception for Ken Russell's 1992, four-hour BBC adaptation of D.H. Lawrence's scandalous novel...The production is impeccably mounted--no pun intended--and the performances (particularly by the daring Ms. Richardson) impassioned."

In September 1994, Adrian Martin said "Russell brings not a skerrick of art or craft to this project."

Dennis Lim of The New York Times called it "a sudsy...mini-series".

The Independent said "What actually happened was perilously close to cartoon."

In 2005, the BBC reported that the show's dramatisation "toned down" the book's "more explicit scenes".

Distribution
The show was released on DVD.

References

External links
 
 

1993 British television series debuts
1993 British television series endings
1990s British drama television series
1990s British romance television series
1990s romantic drama television series
Adultery in television
1990s British television miniseries
English-language television shows
Films based on Lady Chatterley's Lover
Television shows based on British novels
Television series produced at Pinewood Studios
Television series set in the 1920s
Television shows set in England
Works about social class